Sandro Stallbaum (born 14 September 1981) is a German former professional footballer who last played as a defender for Werder Bremen II. Stallbaum started his career as a midfielder but primarily featured as a defender.

Following the 2012–13 season, Stallbaum announced his retirement from professional football.

References

External links

1981 births
Living people
People from Anklam
German footballers
Footballers from Mecklenburg-Western Pomerania
Association football defenders
3. Liga players
SV Werder Bremen II players
1. FC Neubrandenburg 04 players